Angela ja ajan tuulet is a Finnish television series. It aired on Finnish TV in 1999.

Cast
Marika Parkkomäki – Angela
Risto Tuorila – Gabriel
Rea Mauranen – Karin
Petra Frey – Agnes
Esko Salminen – Erik
Jaani Länsiö – Jakob (nuorena)
Kristo Salminen – Jakob (aikuisena)
Kari-Pekka Toivonen – Bengt
Esa-Matti Pölhö – Thomas
Antti Aro – Professori
Milka Ahlroth – Gisela
Esa Saari – Kenraali
Sari Siikander – Raili
Aarre Karén – Goldberg
Sakari Jurkka – Wikström
Vera Kiiskinen – Sigrid
Aila Arajuuri – Vera
Kari Sorvali – Karlsson
Liisa Mustonen – Elisabeth
Kaija Pakarinen – Alma
Elina Knihtilä – Anna
Miina Turunen – Lisa

See also
List of Finnish television series

External links
 

Finnish television shows
1999 Finnish television series debuts
1999 Finnish television series endings
1990s Finnish television series
Yle original programming